There are two species of skink named golden grass mabuya:

 Heremites auratus, a species of skink found in Greece and Turkey, among other places
 Heremites septemtaeniatus, a species of skink found in the Middle East